The Patrick Centre for the Performing Arts is a studio theatre located on Thorp Street in the Chinese Quarter of Birmingham, England, next to the headquarters of the Birmingham Royal Ballet and the Birmingham Hippodrome (public access is via the Hippodrome). Seating 206, it is operated by DanceXchange and specialises in the staging of contemporary dance.

The theatre was designed by Associated Architects and opened in 2001.

External links
 DanceXchange official website

Theatres in Birmingham, West Midlands
2001 establishments in England
Theatres completed in 2001